Martin Baturina (born 16 February 2003) is a Croatian professional footballer currently playing as a midfielder for Prva HNL club Dinamo Zagreb.

Career statistics

Club

Notes

References

2003 births
Living people
Footballers from Split, Croatia
Croatian footballers
Croatia youth international footballers
Association football midfielders
First Football League (Croatia) players
Croatian Football League players
HNK Hajduk Split players
RNK Split players
GNK Dinamo Zagreb II players
GNK Dinamo Zagreb players